Jee Ayan Nu is a Punjabi drama film, released on 8 November 2002.

It stars Harbhajan Mann in the lead role with Priya Gill. It was directed by Manmohan Singh. It is one of the first most successful movie in Punjabi cinema, and is credited of reviving the once successful Punjabi Movie Industry. The movie's songs are quite popular and were sung by Harbhajan Mann, Alka Yagnik and others. Jee Aayan Nu is the first film in the history of Punjabi cinema to be made on such a lavish scale and with renowned technicians who have contributed their best efforts and dedication.

Plot 

Grewal (Kanwaljeet), a business tycoon of the media industry, is a Punjabi settled in Vancouver, British Columbia, Canada with his wife and daughter. Simar (Priya Gill), the elder daughter, was three years old when she was brought to Canada from her birthplace, Punjab. Living a luxurious life in Canada, both daughters are highly influenced by the local culture. Grewal, with his family, returns to Punjab after many years to attend a college function. Grewal meets Inder (Harbhajan Mann) who happens to be Grewal's childhood friend's son. Grewal asks Inder to take Simar around and show her the beauty of Punjab.

While sightseeing Inder makes Simar realize how loving and good-natured Punjabis are and how it is beautifully blended with their culture. Though Simar is impressed, her mother (Navneet Nishan) is not comfortable in her own country and its lifestyle. Inder and Simar soon fall in love, and the families decide to get them married. However, at their engagement, Inder realizes that Simar's family expects Inder to settle in Canada with them after their marriage. Inder refuse to leave Punjab. Annoyed at Inder, the Grewal family returns to Canada.

Time passes and soon Inder's parents, seeing his pain without Simar, insist that he should go to Canada and get his lost love back. Inder leaves and is determined to get Simar back.

Cast
Harbhajan Mann as Inderveer Singh
Priya Gill as Simar
Kimi Verma as Jassi
Kanwaljit Singh as Jasbir Grewal
Navneet Nishan as Kuldeep Grewal
Gurpreet Ghuggi as Ghugi
Deep Dhillon as Arjun Singh
Vivek Shauq as Iqbal
Satinder Satti as Satti
Gopi Bhalla

References

External links 
 

2002 films
Punjabi-language Indian films
2000s Punjabi-language films
Films set in Vancouver

T-Series (company) films
Indian drama films
Films scored by Jaidev Kumar